An infectious bone disease is a bone disease primarily associated with an infection.

An example is osteomyelitis.

References

External links 

Osteopathies